
In Greek mythology, Graecus was the son of Pandora of Thessaly and Zeus. His mother was the daughter of Deucalion and Pyrrha, and sister of Hellen who together with his three sons Dorus, Xuthus (with his sons Ion and Achaeus) and Aeolus, comprised the set of ancient tribes that formed the Greek/Hellenic nation. His possible siblings were Melera and Pandorus.

Mythology
According to Stephanus of Byzantium, Graecus was a son of Thessalus. According to Virgil, Latinus is Graecus's brother. The Graecians, a Hellenic tribe, took their name from Graecus, according to legend. They were one of the first Greek tribes to colonise Italy. The area that came to be known as Magna Graecia then took its name after them. The Latins used the term in reference to all Hellenic people because the first Hellenes they came into contact with were the Graecians.

See also
Graea
Names of the Greeks

Note

Reference 

 Gantz, Timothy, Early Greek Myth: A Guide to Literary and Artistic Sources, Johns Hopkins University Press, 1996, Two volumes:  (Vol. 1),  (Vol. 2).
Hesiod, Catalogue of Women from Homeric Hymns, Epic Cycle, Homerica translated by Evelyn-White, H G. Loeb Classical Library Volume 57. London: William Heinemann, 1914. Online version at theoi.com
Pseudo-Clement, Recognitions from Ante-Nicene Library Volume 8, translated by Smith, Rev. Thomas. T. & T. Clark, Edinburgh. 1867. Online version at theoi.com

External links
Hellenism.Net – Everything about Greece and Greeks
The Ancient Library – Graecus

Characters in Roman mythology
Children of Zeus
Deucalionids
Thessalian mythology